San Leandro Bay is a body of water in the San Francisco Bay. It is connected to the Oakland Estuary today, but was originally separated by land which formerly connected Alameda with Oakland.  It is located along the east of the Oakland International Airport and Bay Farm Island.  The principal stream which flows into San Leandro Bay is San Leandro Creek. Other tributaries include the East Creek/Peralta Creek watershed and the Lion Creek/Arroyo Viejo watershed.  Damon Marsh is located there.

References

Geography of Alameda, California
Bays of California
Geography of Oakland, California
Bays of San Francisco Bay
Bodies of water of Alameda County, California